Illustrated Weekly or The Illustrated Weekly may refer to:

Redpath's Illustrated Weekly
The Illustrated Times Weekly Newspaper
The Illustrated Weekly Hudd
The Illustrated Weekly of India
Weekly Illustrated

See also
Illustrated (disambiguation)
Illustrated Magazine
Illustrated News